Urra may refer to:

 Urra Moor, a moor in North Yorkshire, England
 Urra (antiquity), a city in ancient Babylonia; see Geography of Mesopotamia
 Urra, a parish (freguesia) in the district of Portalegre in Portugal 
 Urra Dam, in Colombia
 Urrá, the company that built the dam

See also
 Urras, a fictional world in The Dispossessed by Ursula K. Le Guin
 Oorah, a battle cry